Siltamäki (Finnish), Brobacka (Swedish) is a northern neighborhood of Helsinki, Finland.

Siltamäki is located next to Vantaa River, which forms the border with the City of Vantaa. The first signs of human activity in Siltamäki can be traced back to 2500-2000 BC. The existing buildings are derived from much later times; 1950 -, 1960 - and 1970's.

In Siltamäki is a shopping center, in addition to shops, a swimming pool. Larger shops are located along the Ring III in Vantaa. In Siltamäki are outdoor opportunities close at hand, with recreation areas, sports fields and golf for example.

Neighbourhoods of Helsinki